Cthulhu Mansion (also known as Black Magic Mansion and La Manson de los Cthulhu) is a 1990 Spanish horror film directed by Juan Piquer Simón.

Plot
Hawk and the rest of his gang go on the run after murdering a drug dealer, at a carnival funhouse, to steal his cocaine. They kidnap a stage magician named Chandu and hideout in his mansion, using the time to tend to injuries and hide from the police and the drug dealer's partner. Hawk breaks into the magician's safe and is disappointed to find a book on Cthulhu instead of cash. Chandu calls upon the powers of the book and unleashes dark spirits upon everyone in the mansion.

Cast
Frank Finlay - Chandu
Marcia Layton - Lisa / Lenore
Luis Fernando Alvés - Chris
Brad Fisher - Hawk
Melanie Shatner - Eva
Kaethe Cherney - Candy
Paul Birchard - Billy
Frank Braña - Felix

Reception
The film received negative reviews for its poor writing, acting and special effects. The acting was described as "dreary readings that are painful to watch".

Releases
Available on DVD, Cthulhu Mansion was also released as a blu-ray with a reversible sleeve and documentary on Simón by Vinegar Syndrome in 2021.

References

External links

1990 films
Cthulhu Mythos films
Spanish horror films
1990 horror films
English-language Spanish films
Films set in country houses
1990 direct-to-video films
1990s English-language films
1990s Spanish films